David Lelay (born 30 December 1979) is a French former road bicycle racer, who is currently working as a directeur sportif for amateur team VCP Loudéac. He is the son of former rider Gilbert Lelay.

After nine seasons as a professional, Lelay joined amateur squad Brest Iroise Cyclisme 2000 for the 2014 season, after his previous team –  – folded at the end of the 2013 season.

Major results
Source:

2000
 2nd Overall Kreiz Breizh Elites
2001
 1st Stage 1 Tour du Loir-et-Cher
2003
 3rd Overall Boucles de la Mayenne
2005
 2nd Overall Tour de la Somme
2006
 1st Stage 2 Boucles de la Mayenne
 2nd Overall Tour de Bretagne
1st Stage 1
 5th Route Adélie
 5th La Poly Normande
 7th Overall Tour de la Somme
 10th GP de Dourges-Hénin-Beaumont
2007
 3rd Grand Prix de Plumelec-Morbihan
 3rd Overall Tour de Bretagne
 5th Overall Tour de Normandie
 7th Route Adélie
 8th Overall Tour du Limousin
2008
 1st Tour du Finistère
 1st Trophée des Grimpeurs
 7th Boucles de l'Aulne
 10th La Poly Normande
 10th Grand Prix de Wallonie
2009
 1st Overall Circuit Cycliste Sarthe
1st Stage 2
 1st Overall Les 3 Jours de Vaucluse
 2nd Overall Four Days of Dunkirk
 2nd Route Adélie
 3rd Time trial, National Road Championships
 3rd Overall Tour du Poitou-Charentes
 3rd Overall Bayern-Rundfahrt
 3rd Classic Loire Atlantique
 6th Tour du Finistère
 6th Chrono des Nations
2010
 5th Grand Prix de Plumelec-Morbihan
 6th Duo Normand
2011
 7th Overall Circuit de Lorraine
2012
 1st Combination classification Tour du Poitou-Charentes
 6th Overall Tour of Britain

References

External links 

Palmares at CyclingBase (French)

French male cyclists
1979 births
Living people
Sportspeople from Saint-Brieuc
Cyclists from Brittany